Phantasis sansibarica is a species of beetle in the family Cerambycidae. It was described by Harold in 1878. It is known from Tanzania, Kenya, and Somalia.

References

Phantasini
Beetles described in 1878